Jacksonville is an unincorporated community in Lewis County, West Virginia, United States.  Its altitude is 1,079 feet (329 m), and it is located at  (38.8909305, -80.4920339).

The community was named after George (or Edward) Jackson, the original owner of the town site.

References

Unincorporated communities in Lewis County, West Virginia
Unincorporated communities in West Virginia